is a Japanese manga written and illustrated by Sanae Rokuya. It is licensed in North America by Digital Manga Publishing, which released the manga on 27 May 2008.

Reception
Leroy Douresseaux noted there were no sex scenes, instead there were kiss scenes, making this title teen-appropriate, but felt that without the character design, the manga was "pedestrian". Danielle Van Gorder found her layouts "striking" and enjoyed the gradual unfurling of the story. Holly Ellingwood enjoyed the "compelling" story.

References

External links

2006 manga
Digital Manga Publishing titles
Yaoi anime and manga